The 1967 Honiton by-election was a by-election held for the British House of Commons constituency of Honiton in Devon on 16 March 1967.  It was won by the Conservative Party candidate Peter Emery.

Vacancy 
The seat had become vacant when the Conservative Member of Parliament (MP), Robert Mathew had died on 8 December 1966. He had held the seat since the 1955 general election and had served as Parliamentary Private Secretary to Derek Walker-Smith.

Result 
The result was a clear victory for Emery, who returned to the Commons after losing his seat at Reading in 1966.
 
Emery held the seat, and its successor East Devon until the 2001 general election.

Votes

See also
Honiton constituency
List of United Kingdom by-elections

References 

 British Parliamentary by-elections: Honiton 1967
 1966 general election results at Richard Kimber's political science resources

By-elections to the Parliament of the United Kingdom in Devon constituencies
1967 in England
1967 elections in the United Kingdom
1960s in Devon
March 1967 events in the United Kingdom